Greek National Road 16a is a national highway in Chalkidiki, Central Macedonia, Greece. It connects Polygyros with Greek National Road 16 near Agios Prodromos.

16A
Roads in Central Macedonia